Joshua Mills (1797 – April 29, 1843) was a pioneer physician and an American politician of the Whig Party who served as the second Mayor of Cleveland, Ohio from 1838 to 1839 and later as the city's fifth mayor in 1842.

Born and raised in New England, Mills arrived to Cleveland in 1827 after receiving an education in medicine. As a physician, he established "the most successful pharmacy in the city" at that time. In 1832, Mills gained public recognition when his aid in Cleveland's 1832 Cholera Epidemic allowed him to secure a position as a member on the municipality's first Board of Health. In 1836, Mills became a Whig alderman, a member of Cleveland City Council and in 1837, council president. A year later, he was elected mayor of Cleveland. He was defeated by Nicolas Dockstader for reelection in 1840 and by John W. Allen in 1841. In 1842, he was re-elected as the city's fifth mayor.

References

Cleveland City Council members
Mayors of Cleveland
Ohio Whigs
19th-century American politicians
1797 births
1841 deaths
Burials at Erie Street Cemetery